The La Mouette SR 210 is a French paramotor that was designed and produced by La Mouette of Fontaine-lès-Dijon for powered paragliding. Now out of production, when it was available the aircraft was supplied complete and ready-to-fly.

Design and development
The SR 210 was designed to comply with the US FAR 103 Ultralight Vehicles rules as well as European regulations. It features a paraglider-style wing, single-place accommodation and a single  Solo 210 engine in pusher configuration with a 2.5:1 ratio reduction drive and a  diameter two-bladed propeller, depending on the model.

As is the case with all paramotors, take-off and landing is accomplished by foot. Inflight steering is accomplished via handles that actuate the canopy brakes, creating roll and yaw.

In reviewing the SR 210 Rene Coulon wrote in 2003, "Their range of paramotors is of the same calibre as their other services: serious and functional".

Variants
SR 210
SR 210 GH

Specifications (SR 210)

References

SR 210
2000s French ultralight aircraft
Single-engined pusher aircraft
Paramotors